Street Corner Symphony may refer to:

 "Streetcorner Symphony", a 2006 song by Rob Thomas
 Street Corner Symphony (album), a 1978 album by Carrie Lucas
 Street Corner Symphony (group), an a cappella group from Nashville, Tennessee